Kahakuloa is an area on the north side of West Maui, Hawaii. It is home to the community of Kahakuloa Village, 

East of the village, at the point, is 646 ft. high.  Kahekili, (c. 1737–1794) was said to leap 200 feet down to the water from this hill in the mornings before eating breakfast, from a spot called "Kahekili's Leap." The next hill, Pu'u Kahuli'anapa, is 547 ft. high.

It is accessible via Kahekili Highway (State Highway 340).

History 
Two men were indicted by a federal grand jury in January 2021 for an alleged racially motivated attack Feb. 13, 2014, on a Caucasian man when he tried to move into their Native Hawaiian neighborhood of Kahakuloa on Maui. The indictment charges Kaulana Alo Kaonohi and Levi Aki Jr. with a hate crime for allegedly attacking a man, identified only as C.K., with a shovel because of his actual and perceived race and color, the U.S. Attorney's Office in Hawaii, the FBI and the Department of Justice's Civil Rights Division said, as reported by Honolulu Star-Advertiser in the January 17, 2020 online edition.

References

Geography of Maui

 5.https://www.staradvertiser.com/2021/01/16/breaking-news/2-men-charged-with-hate-crimes-in-alleged-racially-motivated-attack-on-maui/